The 2014 Houston Dynamo season will be the club's ninth season of existence, and their ninth consecutive season in Major League Soccer, the top flight of American soccer.

Background

Review

Roster

Transfers

In

Out

Loan in

Loan out

Competitions

Preseason

MLS

U.S. Open Cup

Statistical Leaders

Uniforms

See also 
 Houston Dynamo
 2014 in American soccer
 2014 Major League Soccer season

References 

Houston Dynamo FC seasons
Houston Dynamo
Houston Dynamo
2014 in sports in Texas